"The Zoo" is a song by the German hard rock band Scorpions. It was written by group members Rudolf Schenker (guitar) and Klaus Meine (vocals). The song also features a talk box performed by lead guitarist Matthias Jabs.

Background
Schenker wrote much of the music during the band's first tour of the United States in 1979. When Meine first heard Schenker's riff, it reminded him of the band's earlier visit to a street in New York City humorously referred to as a "zoo". Meine later composed the song's lyrics, which contain references to city streets, especially New York's 42nd Street.

The song has been featured on a few Scorpions "Best-Of" compilations, including Deadly Sting, Bad for Good: The Very Best of Scorpions, the box set Box of Scorpions, and a re-recorded version for the Comeblack album.

It has also been used in the soundtrack of the video game NBA 2K18.

Reception
Although the song was released as a single in 1980, it commercially underperformed with limited chart success, peaking at #75 in the UK. Even so, it is a critically acclaimed heavy metal song, one critic noting that "The Zoo" is both "ominously slow and melodically accessible" with a key element being the "Berlin burlesque vocal melody". On this note, it is used by many strippers in their stage act.

References

External links
 "The Zoo" song lyrics from Scorpions' Official Website

1980 songs
1980 singles
Scorpions (band) songs
Songs written by Klaus Meine
Songs written by Rudolf Schenker
EMI Records singles
Harvest Records singles
Mercury Records singles